Voices Within is a 1999 album by Dutch jazz singer Ilse Huizinga.

Track listing
 "Foolin' Myself" (Jack Lawrence, Peter Tinturin)  – 3:21
 "Some Other Time" (Leonard Bernstein, Betty Comden, Adolph Green)  – 2:10
 "I Should Care" (Sammy Cahn, Axel Stordahl, Paul Weston)  – 6:10
 "Better Than Anything" (David "Buck" Wheat, Bill Loughborough)  – 3:41
 "But Beautiful" (Jimmy Van Heusen, Johnny Burke)  – 3:07
 "Day by Day" (Cahn, Stordahl, Weston)  – 4:10
 "Only Trust Your Heart" (Benny Carter, Cahn)  – 1:34
 "Waltz for Debby" (Bill Evans)  – 4:58
 "Social Call" (Gigi Gryce, Jon Hendricks)  – 3:18
 "Quiet Now" (Denny Zeitlin)  – 2:22
 "Almost Like Being in Love" (Frederick Loewe, Alan Jay Lerner)  – 5:35

Personnel

 Ilse Huizinga - vocals
 Erik van der Luijt - piano, arranger
 Ruud Jacobs - double bass
 Frits Landesbergen - drums, vibes
 Ed Verhoeff - guitar
 Enno Spaanderman - soprano saxophone

References

Ilse Huizinga albums
1999 albums